Kehlmann is a German surname. Notable people with the surname include:

Daniel Kehlmann (born 1975), Austrian/German author
Michael Kehlmann (1927–2005), Austrian film and theatre director, screenwriter and actor
Robert Kehlmann (born 1942) artist and writer

See also
 Cullman (disambiguation)
 Cullmann, a surname
 Kuhlman, a surname
 Kuhlmann (disambiguation)
 Kullmann, a surname

German-language surnames